Womb Ghosts is a 2010 Hong Kong horror film directed and written by Dennis Law.

Plot
A dead fetus lives on after death inside a woman's body, existing as a Womb Ghost. Unnatural termination of such life will turn the baby into the evilest and most vicious kind of spirit.

The plot takes place mainly in a mental hospital where the women who are being impregnated mysteriously. When a young inmate had a miscarriage, the doctors tried to remove the dead fetus inside her.

Little did they know that a horrifying outcome is just one of many things that haunts their mental hospital, a non-stop horror experience where haunting begins when life ends…
Only one answer can be given to the existence of such an ungodly creature, the Womb Ghost.

Cast

Release
The film was released on 18 March 2010 in Hong Kong. Womb Ghosts debuted as the eighth highest-grossing film for the weekend on its premiere. The next week, it charted at ninth place. The film has grossed $211,004 in Hong Kong.

Reception
Twitch Film gave the film a generally favorable review while noting that "others will simply see this as another boring Asian ghost flick and it's difficult to contradict them. Even though the film is visually attractive, boasts a solid soundtrack and some decent acting, it's really not all that different from its peers." Film Business Asia gave a rating of four out of ten, stating that Womb Ghosts "has some squirmy moments but is shackled by a confused script."

References

External links
 
 

2010 films
2010s Cantonese-language films
2010s supernatural horror films
Hong Kong horror films
Hong Kong ghost films
Hong Kong supernatural horror films
Films directed by Dennis Law
2010s Hong Kong films